Picket and Clanger Wood is a 66.4 hectare biological Site of Special Scientific Interest in Wiltshire, England, and lies off the A350 national route between the villages of Yarnbrook and Heywood.

It was notified in 1989.

Sources

 Natural England citation sheet for the site (accessed 11 April 2022)

External links
 Natural England website (SSSI information)

Sites of Special Scientific Interest in Wiltshire
Sites of Special Scientific Interest notified in 1989